Ulla or 'Ulla was a Jewish Talmudist and one of the leading Halakhic amoraim in the Land of Israel during the late 3rd and early 4th centuries CE (the second and third amoraic generations).

Biography
In his youth he studied under R. Eleazar II, and he transmitted nine of his teacher's halakhic sayings. He was greatly respected for his learning; and during his visits to Babylonia he seems to have been invited frequently by the Resh Galuta to deliver halakhic lectures. He traveled repeatedly to the Talmudic Academies in Babylonia; and on one of his journeys he was in danger of assassination by one of his companions, saving his life only by condoning the murder of another. Ulla rendered important decisions regarding the benedictions and the calculation of the new moon, and was accustomed to promulgate his rulings in Babylonia when he went there.

He was very strict in his interpretation of religious laws. On one occasion, when he heard R. Huna use an expression which he did not approve, he retorted, "As vinegar to the teeth, and as smoke to eyes, so are the words of R. Huna." Only in the presence of Rav Nachman did Ulla hesitate to pronounce his opinions, generally waiting until Nachman had departed, although he frequently sought Nachman's company.

Of his contemporaries with whom he engaged in controversies may be mentioned, besides R. Nachman, R. Abba, Abimi bar Papa, Hiyya bar Ammi, and R. Judah. But his personal friend, with whom he associated most frequently, was Rabbah bar bar Hana.

In addition to the sayings of his teacher Eleazar, Ulla transmitted those of R. Hoshaiah, Joshua ben Levi, R. Johanan, Rav, and Shimon ben Lakish. His own sayings were transmitted by R. Aha bar Adda, Hamnuna, Hiyya bar Abba, Hiyya bar Ammi, Raba bar Hinena, Rav Chisda, Judah bar Ammi, and Joshua bar Abba.

Raba appears to have been his only son. Ulla died in Babylonia, before his teacher R. Eleazar; but his remains were taken to Palestine for burial.

Quotes 
 Jerusalem is only redeemed by tzedakah.
 Since the time of the Temple's destruction, the Holy One, blessed be He, has nothing in His world save only four cubits of halacha! (i.e. the Divine Presence is found wherever Israel observes Jewish law).

References

Talmud rabbis of the Land of Israel
3rd-century births
4th-century deaths
Place of birth unknown